Ereis sumatrensis is a species of beetle in the family Cerambycidae. It was described by Charles Joseph Gahan in 1907. It is known from Sumatra.

References

Mesosini
Beetles described in 1907